Burton Drayer, MD, FACR, FANN, is an American radiologist and nationally recognized authority on the use of computed tomography and magnetic resonance imaging for diagnosing neurological disorders. From 2003 to 2008, he served as president, The Mount Sinai Hospital. As of 2020, he is the Charles M. and Marilyn Newman Professor and System Chair, Radiology, for The Mount Sinai Health System and Icahn School of Medicine at Mount Sinai Hospital in New York City.

Drayer is the author of more than 200 publications and 41 book chapters and was a consulting editor for Neuroimaging Clinics of North America from 1991 to 2005. He was elected president-elect of the Radiological Society of North America in 2014 and was listed in New York Magazine's Best Doctors from 1996 to 2009.

Biography

Education 
Drayer earned an A.B. in political science from the University of Pennsylvania in 1967. He earned his medical degree from Chicago Medical School in 1971 and completed residencies in neurology at the University of Vermont College of Medicine and in diagnostic radiology at the University of Pittsburgh Medical Center. He completed a fellowship in neuroradiology at the University of Pittsburgh Medical Center in 1978. He is board certified in radiology, neuroradiology, and neurology.

Professional appointments 
From 1978 to 1979, Drayer was director of Neuroradiology at the University of Pittsburgh Children's Hospital. Until 1984 he served as chief of neuroradiology at Duke University Medical Center in Durham, North Carolina, then, until 1986, director of neuroimaging. Drayer then joined the St. Joseph's Hospital and Medical Center in Phoenix, Arizona, where, until 1995, he served as radiologist-in-chief and director of magnetic resonance imaging and research at the Barrow Neurological Institute. In 1995 he joined Mount Sinai Hospital as director of radiology. He is currently Professor and chair at the Department of Radiology at Mount Sinai. From 2003 to 2008, Drayer served as president of Mount Sinai Hospital and executive vice president for hospital and clinical affairs for The Mount Sinai Medical Center. He continues as executive vice president for risk. In 2011 he was elected as chair of the Radiological Society of North America (RSNA) Research & Education (R&E) Foundation Board of Trustees. In November 2014, Drayer was named president of Mount Sinai Hospital and executive vice president for hospital and clinical affairs of Mount Sinai Medical Center.

Research 
Drayer's research focus includes Parkinson's disease, aging, neurodegenerative disease, Alzheimer's disease, cerebral infarction, vascular malformation advanced CT and MRI techniques for the diagnosis of brain neoplasm. He is known for brain iron, neurodegeneration, MR angiographyn, brain infarction, Xenon CT regional cerebral blood flow, atomic, physiologic and functional imaging of the aging brain, and the application of artificial intelligence (AI) in patients with acute neurological conditions.

Journals 
Drayer has served as a reviewer for the American Journal of Neuroradiology, The New England Journal of Medicine, Radiology, the Journal of Computerized Tomography, Neurosurgery, Annals of Neurology, Stroke, Neurology, and the Journal of Magnetic Resonance Imaging. He serves on the editorial advisory boards of US Radiology. Drayer is past president of The American Society of Neuroradiology. He also was president (1995–2001) and founding member of the Neuroradiology Education and Research Foundation of the American Society of Neuroradiology. He served on the board of directors of the Radiological Society of North America since 2003 and was president of the board in 2011. He currently chairs the Radiological Society of North America Research and Education Foundation.

Awards and honors
2016	Honorary Membership of the European Society of Radiology 
2011	President, Radiological Society of North America
2010	President-Elect, Radiological Society of North America
2008	Distinguished Service Award, American Board of Radiology
1998	Fellow, American College of Radiology
1993	Distinguished Alumnus Award, Chicago Medical School
1982	Fellow, American Academy of Neurology
1977	Cornelius G. Dyke Award, American Society of Neuroradiology
1977	First Prize President's Award, Pittsburgh Roentgen Ray Society

Books
Keller PJ, Drayer BP, Fram EK: Magnetic Resonance Angiography, Vol 2(4) Neuroimaging Clinics of North America, Drayer BP (Consulting Editor), W.B. Saunders, Philadelphia, 1992; pp 835
Brasch RC: MRI Contrast Enhancement in the Central Nervous System. A Case Approach. (Assoc. Eds., Drayer BP, Haughton VM, Jinkins JR, Nelson KL, Sze G); Raven Press 1993, pp 334

Publications
Drayer has a H-index of 44 and there are more than 20,000 citations of his publications.

Partial list of peer-reviewed articles:

Bederson J, Mocco J, Drayer B, Lehar J, Cho S, Costa A, Oermann EK. Automated deep-neural-network surveillance of cranial images for acute neurologic events. Nat Med. 2018 Sep;24(9):1337-1341. doi: 10.1038/s41591-018-0147-y. Epub 2018 Aug 13.

References

External links
Mount Sinai Health System Profile
Icahn School of Medicine at Mount Sinai homepage

Living people
Icahn School of Medicine at Mount Sinai faculty
American radiologists
University of Pennsylvania alumni
University of Vermont alumni
Rosalind Franklin University of Medicine and Science alumni
University of Pittsburgh fellows
American health care chief executives
Year of birth missing (living people)